The Château de Cabrerets is a castle in the commune of Cabrerets in the Lot département of France.

It has been listed since 1996 as a monument historique by the French Ministry of Culture.

See also
List of castles in France

References

External links
 

Castles in Lot
Monuments historiques of Lot (department)